Cecil B. Ferguson (August 27, 1883 – September 5, 1943) was a professional baseball player.

He was a right-handed pitcher over parts of six seasons (1906–1911) with the New York Giants and Boston Doves/Rustlers. During his career, he compiled a 29–46 record in 142 appearances, with a 3.34 earned run average and 298 strikeouts.

After his baseball career, Ferguson became an osteopathic doctor, and gave medical treatment to many Major League baseball players. He graduated with a Doctor of Osteopathic Medicine (D.O.) from the Kirksville College of Osteopathic Medicine. Ferguson was also the coach of the baseball team at the American School of Osteopathy.

Ferguson died in Montverde, Florida, aged 60.

See also
 List of Major League Baseball annual saves leaders

References

1883 births
1943 deaths
Boston Doves players
Boston Rustlers players
Major League Baseball pitchers
Baseball players from Indiana
New York Giants (NL) players
People from Lake City, Florida
People from Elkhart County, Indiana
Lansing Senators players
South Bend Greens players
Louisville Colonels (minor league) players
American osteopathic physicians
Venice Tigers players